A Sardar or Sirdar is a Sherpa mountain guide who manages all the other Sherpas in a climbing expedition or trekking group; Sirdar is the most common spelling used in the majority of English-language mountaineering literature. The Sirdar is typically the most experienced guide and can usually speak English fluently. The Sirdar's responsibilities include:

 assigning responsibilities to the other guides
 hiring and paying local porters
 purchasing local food during the trek/expedition
 making the final decision regarding route choices
 handling other trip logistics such as dealing with government officials or police.

The normal progression to Sirdar usually involves starting as a porter, working their way up to being a kitchen assistant, on to an assistant guide and then finally to Sirdar. Sirdars do not normally carry loads but will do so on occasion such as carrying the pack of a client who is having difficulties from altitude sickness. The appellation is sometimes qualified with expeditions having an overall Sirdar but with other individuals in subsidiary roles such as base-camp sirdar and ice-fall sirdar.

See also
List of Mount Everest guides

References

Mountain guides